Tim Pratt (born December 12, 1976) is an American science fiction and fantasy writer and poet. He won a Hugo Award in 2007 for his short story "Impossible Dreams". He has written over 20 books, including the Marla Mason series and several Pathfinder Tales novels. His writing has earned him nominations for Nebula, Mythopoeic, World Fantasy, and Bram Stoker awards and been published in numerous markets, including Asimov's Science Fiction, Realms of Fantasy, Orson Scott Card's InterGalactic Medicine Show, and Strange Horizons.

Life and career 
Pratt grew up in the vicinity of Dudley, North Carolina, and attended Appalachian State University, where he earned a Bachelor's degree in English. In 1999 he attended the Clarion East Writing Workshop. He moved to Santa Cruz, California in 2000, and now resides in Berkeley with his wife, Heather Shaw, and son, River. He currently works as a senior editor at Locus Magazine.

He has also contributed to the Science Fiction and Fantasy Writers of America (SFWA) Collection archived at the Northern Illinois University Libraries.

In 2018, the performance of his short story "Six Jobs" at Podcastle won (and declined) the Parsec award for Best Speculative Fiction Story: Small Cast (Short Form).

Bibliography

Novels

As Tim Pratt 
 The Strange Adventures of Rangergirl, Bantam Spectra, 2005
The Nex, Tropism Press, 2010
Briarpatch, ChiZine Publications, 2011
Venom in Her Veins: A Forgotten Realms Novel, Wizards of the Coast, 2012
Pathfinder Tales: City of the Fallen Sky, Paizo Publishing, 2012
Pathfinder Tales: Liar's Blade, Paizo Publishing, 2013
The Stormglass Protocol, 2013 (with Andy Deemer)
Heirs of Grace, 47North, 2014
Pathfinder Tales: Reign of Stars, Paizo Publishing, 2014
Pathfinder Tales: Liar's Island, Paizo Publishing, 2015
Pathfinder Tales: Liar's Bargain, Paizo Publishing, 2016
The Wrong Stars: Book I of the Axiom, Angry Robot, 2017
The Dreaming Stars: Book II of the Axiom, Angry Robot, 2018
The Forbidden Stars: Book III of the Axiom, Angry Robot, 2019
Doors of Sleep: Book I of the Journals of Zaxony Delatree, Angry Robot, 2021
Prison of Sleep: Book II of the Journals of Zaxony Delatree, Angry Robot, 2022

As T.A. Pratt (Marla Mason novels) 
 Blood Engines (#1), Bantam Spectra, 2007
 Poison Sleep (#2), Bantam Spectra, 2008
 Dead Reign (#3), Bantam Spectra, 2008
 Spell Games (#4), Bantam Spectra, 2009
 Broken Mirrors (#5), 2010
 Grim Tides (#6), 2012
 Bride of Death (#7), 2013
 Lady of Misrule (#8), 2015
 Queen of Nothing (#9), 2015
 Closing Doors (#10), 2017
Do Better: The Marla Mason Stories, 2018

As T. Aaron Payton 
 The Constantine Affliction, Night Shade Books, 2012

Collections
 Little Gods, Prime Books, 2003
 If There Were Wolves (poetry), Prime Books, 2006
 Hart & Boot & Other Stories, Night Shade Books, 2007
 Antiquities and Tangibles & Other Stories, Merry Blacksmith, 2013
The Christmas Mummy and Other Carols, 2017 (with Heather Shaw)
 The Alien Stars And Other Novellas, Angry Robot, 2021

Edited Anthologies
 Sympathy for the Devil, Night Shade Books, 2010
 Rags and Bones: New Twists on Timeless Tales, Little Brown, 2013 (with Melissa Marr)

Awards and nominations 

 Nominated, 2018 Philip K. Dick Award – The Wrong Stars: Book I of the Axiom, Angry Robot
 Nominated, 2010 Theodore Sturgeon Memorial Award – "Her Voice in a Bottle", Subterranean Win
 Nominated, 2008 Bram Stoker Award – "The Dude Who Collected Lovecraft" (with Nick Mamatas), Chizine
 Nominated, 2008 World Fantasy Award – Hart & Boot & Other Stories, Night Shade Books
 Winner, 2007 Hugo Award – "Impossible Dreams", Asimov's Science Fiction
 The Strange Adventures of Rangergirl (Bantam Spectra)
Winner, 2006 Emperor Norton Award
 Nominated, 2006 Mythopoeic Award
 Nominated, 2006 Gaylactic Spectrum Award
 Winner, 2005 Rhysling Award – "Soul Searching", Strange Horizons
 Nominated, 2005 Rhysling Award – "Making Monsters", Strange Horizons
 Nominated, 2004 Gaylactic Spectrum Award – "Down With the Lizards and the Bees", Realms of Fantasy
 Nominated, 2004 Gaylactic Spectrum Award – "Living with the Harpy", Strange Horizons
Nominated, 2004 John W. Campbell Award for Best New Writer
 Nominated, 2002 Nebula Award – "Little Gods", Strange Horizons

External links
TimPratt.org, the author's website. Includes his blog, bibliography, and links to some of his stories online.
List of awards at the Science Fiction Awards Database
Interview excerpt from the November 2005 issue of Locus Magazine
 
 REVIEW : Rags and Bones

References 

21st-century American novelists
American fantasy writers
American male novelists
American science fiction writers
Writers from California
Hugo Award-winning writers
1976 births
Living people
American male short story writers
Rhysling Award for Best Long Poem winners
21st-century American short story writers
American LGBT writers
21st-century American male writers